The 71st Pennsylvania House of Representatives District is located in central Pennsylvania and has been represented by Jim Rigby since 2019.

District profile
The 71st District is located in Cambria County and Somerset County and includes the following areas:

Cambria County

Adams Township
Allegheny Township
Ashville
Cassandra
Chest Springs
Chest Township
Clearfield Township
Cresson
 Cresson Township
Dean Township
 Ferndale
Gallitizin
Gallitzin
 Geistown
Lilly
Loretto
Munster Township
Portage
Portage Township
Reade Township
 Richland Township
Sankertown
 Scalp Level
 South Fork
 Stonycreek Township
Summerhill Township
Tunnelhill (Cambria County Portion)
Washington Township
 White Township
Wilmore

Somerset County

Ogle Township
 Paint
Paint Township
Windber

Representatives

References

Government of Cambria County, Pennsylvania
Government of Somerset County, Pennsylvania
71